Christ - Deemed to be University is a deemed-to-be-university in Bangalore, Karnataka, India. Founded in 1969 as Christ College, the University Grants Commission (UGC) of India conferred autonomy to Christ College in 2004. On 22 July 2008 it was declared as an institution deemed to be university under section 3 of UGC Act 1956 by the Ministry of Education (India). The deemed-to-be-university is under the management of the priests of the Catholic religious order, Carmelites of Mary Immaculate (CMI), part of Syro Malabar Major Archiepiscopal Church. In 2016, the university was accredited by National Assessment and Accreditation Council with A+ Grade.

History 
Christ (Deemed to be University) was born out of the educational vision of St. Kuriakose Elias Chavara, an educationist and social reformer of the nineteenth century in South India. Chavara founded the first indigenous Catholic congregation Carmelites of Mary Immaculate (CMI) in 1831, which administers Christ (Deemed to be University). Established in 1969 as Christ College, the University Grants Commission (UGC) of India conferred autonomy to Christ College in 2004 and identified it as an "institution with potential for excellence" in 2006. In 2008 under section 3 of the UGC Act, 1956, the Ministry of Human Resource Development of the Government of India, declared the institution a "deemed to be university" in the name and style of Christ University. Later in 2018, upon the direction of Supreme Court of India, the word university was removed, thus making it Christ (Deemed to be University). Christ was one of the first institutions in India to be accredited in 1998 by the National Assessment and Accreditation Council (NAAC), and subsequently in 2004 and 2016 had been awarded Grade 'A' on 4-point scale.

Campus
It is on the extension of Hosur Road (NH 7) opposite the Bangalore Dairy Circle Flyover. The city campus is close to residential localities such as BTM Layout, a residential and commercial area; Koramangala, another large neighborhood; and Jayanagar, one of the largest residential neighborhoods in Bangalore. In 2009, Christ (Deemed to be University) opened its Kengeri campus, which is spread over 75 acres at Kengeri on the Bangalore-Mysore highway SH 17 and houses the School of Engineering and Technology; the PU Residential College; the School of Business and Management, which offers Master of Business Administration (MBA) and Bachelor of Business Administration (BBA) programs; as well as the School of Architecture, which was started officially from 2017. Christ (Deemed to be University) also has a campus in Hulimavu on Bannerghatta Road, inaugurated in May 2016. Christ (Deemed to be University) opened its new campus in Yeshwanthpur in July 2022, which started functioning from August 2022. The campus is 10 stories tall and spread over 1.6 million square feet of space. Apart from these campuses, Christ has two more campuses: in Lavasa, Pune, which was established in 2007; and in Delhi NCR, established in 2013.

The campuses are zero waste campuses and recycle their wet waste and used paper.

Organization and administration
The university is managed by the CHRIST (Deemed to be University) Trust, which in turn is organized by the CMI congregation, under the Syro Malabar Major Archiepiscopal Church. The chancellor of the university is always the rector of the Dharmaram Pontifical Seminary. The present vice-chancellor is  Fr Abraham V. M.

Academics
The university has over 20,000 students and more than 800 faculty members.  It has a foreign student community of about 700 from 58 nationalities.  The university offers nationally and internationally recognised undergraduate, postgraduate and research programmes.

Academic programmes

Undergraduate programmes

The university offers over 50 undergraduate programmes in humanities, social sciences, science, commerce and management, education, law and engineering. Undergraduate programmes are of three-year duration except in the case of Bachelor of Education (BEd, two years), Bachelor of Hotel Management (BHM, four years), Bachelor of Laws (LLB, five years), Bachelor of Technology (BTech, four years) and an integrated BTech/MTech or MBA (five years). Except for Bachelor of Business Administration (BBA), Bachelor of Commerce (BCom), Bachelor of Arts (BA) and Bachelor of Science (BSc) programmes follow a Triple Major system. 

Wikipedia in the undergraduate programme

The institution entered into a memorandum of understanding with the Centre for Internet and Society, Bangalore to make article writing on Wikipedia a core exercise for the continuous internal assessment of its 1600 undergraduate students in Hindi, Kannada, Tamil, Sanskrit and Urdu. The Hindi and Kannada articles may be found at collection of Hindi articles and collection of Kannada articles.

Post-graduate programmes
The university offers 47 master's, 17 Master of Philosophy and 21 PhD degree programmes in Humanities, Social Sciences, Science, Law, Education, commerce and management, and Engineering. Masters programmes are of two years duration, except for Master of Computer Science and Master of Law which are three years and one-year duration, respectively.

Publications 
The university has published over 220 books in Kannada, through Kannada Sangha, a non-profit organisation of the university promoting Kannada.

Membership
The university is a member of the Association of Indian Universities and
International Federation of Catholic Universities (IFCU)

Rankings

According to the QS India rankings for 2020, Christ is positioned 20–25.  In 2019, Christ was ranked 19.  Among Asian universities it is ranked 501–550.

According to India Today Best Universities Survey 2022 Christ University is Ranked 2 in General (Private) University Category.

According to India Today MDRA Survey of Excellence National Rankings, Best Colleges of India - Christ University is Ranked 1 for BCA Programme, Ranked 4 for BBA, Ranked 7 for Commerce, Ranked 7 for Media and Social works, Ranked 9 for Arts.

India Today conducts annual surveys and rates institutions of higher education in India on several parameters. The rankings are summarised in the two tables.

The Week in association with Hansa research conducted the Week-Hansa research survey and the rankings are listed in the table

Notable alumni

World records
On 10 January 2011, Christ Junior College, Bangalore, under ensemble director Vineeth Vincent, in an event titled 'Can You Say Beat Box?' created the largest human beatbox ensemble in the Limca Book of Records with 2136 participants. 
According to the Guinness World Records, the previous record for the largest human beatbox ensemble involved 1,246 participants and was achieved by Vineeth Vincent and Christ University (India) in Bangalore, Karnataka, India, on 5 February 2011. This record was broken by Shlomo on 14 November 2011 with 2,081 participants.
The record was broken by Booking.com on 10 December 2013 with 4695 participants.

Controversies
In 2008, Christ College was involved in a controversy surrounding the granting of deemed university status. The institute is now a deemed to be university. The institute has also been under public scrutiny after allegations of sexual harassment against its faculty surfaced in June 2021.

See also 
 List of deemed universities
 Dharmaram College
 Bangalore

References

External links

 
Carmelite educational institutions
Catholic universities and colleges in India
Pre University colleges in Karnataka
Association of Christian Universities and Colleges in Asia
Educational institutions established in 1969
1969 establishments in Mysore State